Olympic Sports Center station may refer to:

Olympic Sports Center station (Beijing Subway), on Line 8, China
Olympic Sports Center station (Hangzhou Metro), on Line 6 and Line 7, China
Olympic Sports Center station (Ningbo Rail Transit), on Line 4, China
Olympic Sports Center station (Chongqing Rail Transit), on Loop line (Chongqing Rail Transit), China
Olympic Sports Center station (Zhengzhou Metro), on Line 6 and Line 14 of Zhengzhou Metro, China
Olympic Sports Center station (Changzhou Metro), on Line 1 (Changzhou Metro), China
Huangcun station, formerly known as Olympic Sports Center station, on Line 4, China

See also
Olympic Stadium station (disambiguation)